For the two decades preceding the Republic of the Congo's 1991 National Conference, the country was firmly in the socialist camp, allied principally with the Soviet Union and other Eastern bloc nations. Educational, economic, and foreign aid links between Congo and its Eastern bloc allies were extensive, with the Congolese military and security forces receiving significant Soviet, East German, and Cuban assistance.

After the worldwide dissolution of the Soviet Union and Congo's adoption of multi-party democracy in 1991, Congo's bilateral relations with its former socialist allies have become relatively less important. France is now by far Congo's principal external partner, contributing significant amounts of economic assistance, while playing a highly influential role.

Congo-Brazzaville is also a member of the International Criminal Court with a Bilateral Immunity Agreement of protection for the US-military.

Membership in international organizations includes the United Nations, Organisation of African Unity, African Development Bank, General Agreement on Tariffs and Trade (GATT), Economic Commission for Central African States, Central African Customs and Economic Union, International Coffee Organization, Union of Central African States, INTELSAT, International Criminal Police Organization - Interpol, Non-Aligned Movement, and Group of 77.

Disputes - international:
most of the Congo River boundary with the Democratic Republic of the Congo is indefinite (no agreement has been reached on the division of the river or its islands, except in the Pool Malebo (Stanley Pool) area.

Bilateral relations

See also
 List of diplomatic missions in the Republic of the Congo
 List of diplomatic missions of the Republic of the Congo
 Visa requirements for Republic of the Congo citizens

References